The 2013 Girls' Youth Pan-American Volleyball Cup takes place April 29 to May 4, in Guatemala City. The top ranked team of Pool B at the end of the round-robin preliminary phase will be granted a ticket to the 2013 Youth World Championship in the city of Nakhon Ratchasima, in Thailand, from July 26 to August 4.

According to the competition format, the top two ranked teams in Pool A, will advance directly to the semifinals, while the third and fourth placed squads will meet in the quarterfinals with the top teams of Pool B in cross-over matches.

First round

Pool A

Pool B

Final round

Championship bracket

5th–8th places bracket

Quarterfinals

Classification 5/8

Semifinals

Seventh place match

Fifth place match

Bronze medal match

Final

Final standing

Individual awards

Most Valuable Player
 
Best Scorer
 
Best Spiker
 
Best Blocker
 
Best Server
 
Best Digger
 
Best Setter
 
Best Receiver
 
Best Libero

External links
Events listing

Women's Pan-American Volleyball Cup
Youth Pan American Volleyball Cup
Girls Youth Pan American Volleyball Cup
Volleyball